Pietro Respighi S.T.D. JUD (22 September 1843 – 22 March 1913) was an Italian Cardinal of the Roman Catholic Church and Archpriest of the Basilica of St. John Lateran.

He was born in Bologna , the son of a mathematics professor at the University of Bologna. Pietro studied philosophy with Battaglini, who later became archbishop of Bologna. 

He received the sacrament of confirmation in November 1850. He was educated in the Seminary of Bologna and the Pio Roman Seminary in Rome, earning doctorates in theology, civil and canon law in 1870. Ordained to the priesthood on the last day of March 1866 in Rome, he afterwards worked in the Archdiocese of Bologna as professor  of Sacred Liturgy and Christian Archology of its seminary from 1872 to June 1874. He was appointed as Archpriest of Santi Gervasio e Protasio parish until 1891.

Episcopate and Cardinalate
Pope Leo XIII appointed him Bishop of Guastalla on 14 December 1891. He was appointed to the see of Ferrara in 1896. As Archbishop of Ferrara he was created Cardinal-Priest of Santi Quattro Coronati in the consistory of 19 June 1899. He resigned pastoral government of the archdiocese of Ferrara on 19 April 1900. On the death of Pope Leo XIII he participated in the conclave of 1903 that elected Pope Pius X. He was Camerlengo of the Sacred College of Cardinals from 1906 until 1907, and in 1910 he was appointed Archpriest of the Patriarchal Lateran basilica, a position he held until his death three years later.

Notes and References

1843 births
1913 deaths
20th-century Italian cardinals
Cardinals created by Pope Leo XIII
Cardinal Vicars
Clergy from Bologna
Roman Catholic archbishops in Italy
Bishops of Ferrara
19th-century Italian Roman Catholic bishops